Firm Roots is a live album by pianist Cedar Walton recorded in 1974 and released on the Muse label in 1976.

Reception
Allmusic awarded the album 4 stars.

Track listing 
All compositions by Cedar Walton except as indicated
 "Firm Roots" - 7:24   
 "Shoulders" - 7:16   
 "One for Amos" (Sam Jones) - 6:47   
 "You Are the Sunshine of My Life" (Stevie Wonder) - 6:58   
 "I'm Not So Sure" - 7:53   
 "Voices Deep Within Me" - 8:34

Personnel 
Cedar Walton - piano, electric piano 
Sam Jones - bass
Louis Hayes - drums

References 

Cedar Walton live albums
1976 live albums
Muse Records live albums